Olga Arsenievna Oleinik (also as Oleĭnik) HFRSE (2 July 1925 – 13 October 2001) was a Soviet mathematician who conducted pioneering work on the theory of partial differential equations, the theory of strongly inhomogeneous elastic media, and the mathematical theory of boundary layers. She was a student of Ivan Petrovsky.  She studied and worked at the Moscow State University.

She received many prizes for her remarkable contributions: the Chebotarev Prize in 1952; the State Prize 1988; the Petrowsky Prize in 1995; and the Prize of the Russian Academy of Sciences in 1995. Also she was member of several foreign academies of sciences, and earned several honorary degrees.

Life 

On 2 May 1985 Olga Oleinik was awarded the laurea honoris causa by the Sapienza University of Rome, jointly with Fritz John.

Work

Research activity 
She authored more than 370 mathematical publications and 8 monographs, as the sole author or in collaboration with others: her work covers algebraic geometry, the theory of partial differential equations where her work enlightened various aspects, elasticity theory and boundary layers theory.

Teaching activity 
She was an enthusiast and very active teacher, advising the thesis of 57 "candidates".

Selected publications of Olga Oleinik 
. An important paper where the author describes generalized solutions of nonlinear partial differential equations as BV functions.
. An important paper where the author constructs a weak solution in BV for a nonlinear partial differential equation with the method of vanishing viscosity.
. An important paper in the theory of the Stefan problem: generalizing earlier work of her doctoral student S. L. Kamenomostskaya, the author proves the existence of a generalized solution for the multi dimensional model.
 (reviews of the Russian edition).
.
.
.
.
.
.

See also 
Boundary layer
Bounded variation
Elasticity theory
Homogenization
Partial differential equations
Stefan problem
Weak solutions

Notes

References

Biographical and general references
. The story of the life of Gaetano Fichera written by his wife, Matelda Colautti Fichera: this reference is important for understanding the friendship between Olga Oleinik, Gaetano Fichera and his wife.
. Some recollections of the authors about Olga Ladyzhenskaya and Olga Oleinik.
. An ample commemorative paper written by three friends/collaborators.
 (Also available at the Internet Archive).
. A short obituary notice by Louis Nirenberg.
. Some recollections of the author about Olga Ladyzhenskaya and Olga Oleinik.
.
. The "regest of honoris causa degrees from 1944 to 1985" (English translation of the title) is itself a detailed and carefully commented regest of all the documents of the official archive of the Sapienza University of Rome pertaining to the honoris causa degrees awarded or not. It includes all the awarding proposals submitted during the considered period, detailed presentations of the work of the candidate, if available, and precise references to related articles published on Italian newspapers and magazines, if the laurea was awarded.

Scientific references
. This monograph consists of two volumes and is devoted to second-order partial differential equations (mainly, equations with nonnegative characteristic form). A number of problems of qualitative theory (for example, local smoothness and hypoellipticity) are presented, and the work of many contributors, like Olga Oleinik, Gaetano Fichera, the Author himself and others area thoroughly reviewed.
. This monograph consists of two volumes and is devoted to second-order partial differential equations (mainly, equations with nonnegative characteristic form). A number of problems of qualitative theory (for example, local smoothness and hypoellipticity) are presented, and the work of many contributors, like Olga Oleinik, Gaetano Fichera, the Author himself and others area thoroughly reviewed.

External links
. The proceedings of a workshop in honour of Olga Ladyzhenskaya and Olga Oleinik.
.
.

. A biography in the Biographies of Women Mathematicians, Agnes Scott College.

Soviet mathematicians
Soviet women mathematicians
1925 births
2001 deaths
20th-century Russian mathematicians
Moscow State University alumni
Academic staff of Moscow State University
Academic staff of the Moscow Institute of Physics and Technology
Full Members of the Russian Academy of Sciences
Recipients of the USSR State Prize
Algebraic geometers
Mathematical physicists
PDE theorists
Burials in Troyekurovskoye Cemetery